Magpahanggang Wakas (Lit: Until the End / English title: I'll Never Say Goodbye) is a 2016 Philippine romantic melodrama television series directed by FM Reyes, starring Jericho Rosales, Arci Muñoz and John Estrada. The series aired from September 19, 2016 to January 6, 2017 on ABS-CBN's Primetime Bida evening block and worldwide on The Filipino Channel, replacing Born for You.

Series overview

Episodes

References

Lists of Philippine drama television series episodes